Le Petit Prince a Dit is 1992 French-Swiss drama film written and directed by Christine Pascal. The film follows an estranged Swiss couple who re-evaluate their relationship with the discovery of their daughter's terminal illness. It premiered on 3 September 1992 at the Montreal World Film Festival.

Plot
A young girl, Violette goes to live with her grandmother after her parents, Adam and Mélanie separate. Thus she rarely gets an opportunity to see her busy parents. Her mother is concerned at her daughter's clumsiness and convinces her estranged husband to take her to see a doctor. The medical examination reveals that Violette has a brain tumour and is likely to die within a few months. Adam decides to take Violette on a road trip to Italy where her mother is rehearsing for a play.  Violette disapproves of  her father's new girlfriend and longs to see her parents reunited. Upon the realisation that Violette only has days left to live, Adam and Mélanie attempt to make their daughter's wish a reality.

Cast
Richard Berry as Adam Leibovich
Anémone as Melanie
Marie Kleiber as Violette Leibovich
Lucie Phan as Lucie
Mista Préchac as Minerve
Claude Muret as Jean-Pierre
Jean Cuenoud as Otto
John Gutwirth as Victor

Awards and nominations
César Award for Best Film - nomination
César Award for Best Director -  Christine Pascal (nomination)
César Award for Best Actor - Richard Berry (nomination)
César Award for Best Actress - Anémone (nomination)

Montreal World Film Festival
Best Actor - Richard Berry (won)
Best Screenplay - Christine Pascal and Robert Boner (won)
Louis Delluc Prize - Christine Pascal (won)

References

External links
 

1992 films
French drama films
1990s French-language films
Swiss drama films
Films set in Switzerland
Louis Delluc Prize winners
Films scored by Bruno Coulais
French-language Swiss films
1990s French films